Angelo Heinz Panetaleo Leaupepe (Redcliffe, 29 July 1997) is a New Zealand rugby union player. His usual position is as a wing, and he currently plays for Colorno in the  Italian Top10.

In 2017 and 2018, Leaupepe was named in the National Rugby Championship team Melbourne Rising. 
He played for Valorugby Emilia in Top12 from 2020 to 2022. Hel also played for Petrarca Padova.

References 

It's Rugby England Profile

1997 births
Living people
New Zealand rugby union players
Melbourne Rising players
Valorugby Emilia players
Rugby union wings
Rugby union players from Queensland